Anivorano Nord or Anivorano Avaratra is a municipality  in Madagascar. It belongs to the district of Antsiranana II, which is a part of Diana Region. 

Primary and junior level secondary education are available in town. It is also a site of industrial-scale  mining. The majority 99% of the population are farmers.  The most important crop is rice, while other important products are peanut and maize.  Services provide employment for 1% of the population.

Geography 
Anivorano Nord is situated at the Route nationale 6 at 69 km from Diego Suarez. Next towns are Ambilobe and Andrafiabe.

References and notes 

Populated places in Diana Region